Peroxisomal membrane protein PMP34 is a protein that in humans is encoded by the SLC25A17 gene.

Function 

SLC25A17 is a peroxisomal membrane protein that belongs to the family of mitochondrial solute carriers.[supplied by OMIM]

See also 
 Solute carrier family

References

Further reading 

 
 
 
 
 
 
 
 
 

Solute carrier family